Donald Gordon Duguid  (born January 25, 1935) is a Canadian champion curler. A three-time winner of the Canadian Brier and two-time World Curling champion, Duguid won the Brier in 1965, 1970 and 1971, and the Worlds in 1970 and 1971. He was only the second skip ever to win back to back Briers in 1971.   He was inducted into the Canadian Curling Hall of Fame in 1974, Canada's Sports Hall of Fame in 1991, and the WCF Hall of Fame in 2013. In 2014, he was made a member of the Order of Manitoba. In 1981, his 1970 & 1971 teams were inducted into the Manitoba Sports Hall of Fame.

He provided curling commentary for NBC at the 2002 Winter Olympics in Salt Lake City and the 2006 Winter Olympics in Turin with Don Chevrier, and with Andrew Catalon and Colleen Jones at the 2010 Winter Olympics in Vancouver.

Duguid is the father of Terry Duguid, a Manitoba businessman and politician (Liberal Member of Parliament for Winnipeg South), as well as Dale Duguid, a former Manitoba provincial curling champion, Dean Duguid, Randy Duguid and Kevin Duguid.

In 2020, he was appointed as a Member of the Order of Canada.

References

External links
 

1935 births
Living people
Brier champions
Canadian sports announcers
Canadian people of Scottish descent
Curling broadcasters
Members of the Order of Manitoba
Members of the Order of Canada
Curlers from Winnipeg
World curling champions
Canadian male curlers